USLHT Elm was a motorized derrick barge which was used to build and maintain aids to navigation.  She was classed as a lighthouse tender and operated by the United States Lighthouse Service.  Elm was launched in 1918 and sold in 1934.

Construction
The contract for the hull was awarded to Rice Brothers Corporation in East Boothbay, Maine on January 13, 1917.   The contract price was $29,400.  On July 10, 1917 a fire broke out in the shipyard which destroyed all but four hull frames.  Despite the setback, Elm was launched on July 23, 1918.  She was placed in commission on July 19, 1919.  Her total cost was $93,638.

Her displacement at that draft was 318 tons. Elm had a single wooden deck. The ship had a single derrick mast with two booms. The mast was located forward on deck, with the booms swinging aft. A small steam engine was used to power the crane hoists.

Propulsion was provided by a 150-horsepower kerosine-fueled internal combustion engine. This was a 2-cycle, 3-cylinder engine. This engine drove a right-handed, four-blade cast iron propeller  in diameter.

She had accommodations for a complement of two officers and four men.  There was also a spare stateroom, mess, and galley in a deck house aft on the ship.  A cargo hold under the deck had a capacity of 70 tons.

Operational history 
Elm's first home port was Tompkinsville, on Staten Island, New York. She was assigned to the Third Lighthouse District which had its main depot at Tompkinsville.  In July 1919 Elm began work improving aids to navigation in the Hudson River.

On November 9, 1922, Elm was at Block Island, Rhode Island where she damaged a dock.

In 1930 she was transferred to the Eleventh Lighthouse District and her homeport was changed to Detroit, Michigan.  On August 1, 1934 the superintendent of lighthouses in Detroit took sealed bids for Elm.  She was sold on August 14, 1934.  Her ultimate fate is unknown.

References 

Ships of the United States Lighthouse Service
1918 ships